This is a list of the founding members of the United States National Academy of Engineering.

 Hendrik Wade Bode
 Walker Lee Cisler
 Hugh Latimer Dryden
 Elmer William Engstrom
 William Littell Everitt
 Antoine Marc Gaudin
 Michael Lawrence Haider
 George Edward Holbrook
 John Herbert Hollomon, Jr.
 Thomas Christian Kavanagh
 Augustus Braun Kinzel
 James Nobel Landis
 Clarence Hugo Linder
 Clark Blanchard Millikan
 Nathan Mortimore Newmark
 William Hayward Pickering
 Simon Ramo
 Arthur Emmons Raymond
 Thomas Kilgore Sherwood
 Julius Adams Stratton
 Chauncey Guy Suits
 Frederick Emmons Terman
 Charles Allen Thomas
 Eric Arthur Walker
 Ernst Weber

References 
 

National Academy of Engineering